Peñailillo is a surname. Notable people with the surname include:

 Nicolás Peñailillo (born 1991), Chilean footballer
 Rodrigo Peñailillo (born 1973), Chilean politician

Spanish-language surnames